Charles-François Angelet (18 November 1797 – 20 December 1832) was a Flemish pianist and composer.

Life
His father was his first music teacher; at age seven, he gave a concert. Aged seventeen, he was appointed organist of a church in Wetteren, near Ghent.

In 1821 he went to the Conservatoire de Paris; he studied piano with Pierre-Joseph-Guillaume Zimmerman, harmony and accompaniment with Victor Dourlen, and composition with François-Joseph Fétis, the director of the conservatoire, who thought he was a promising composer. In 1822 he won first prize in a piano competition at the conservatoire, and was appointed répétiteur.

He moved to Brussels, where he was a piano teacher at the Royal Music School.

In 1829 he became pianist of the court of William I of the Netherlands. After a period of failing health he died in Ghent in 1832, aged 35.

Compositions
Angelet wrote a symphony that won a prize in Ghent in 1820. His other compositions are mostly piano music; he also wrote a piano trio and some songs.

Fétis wrote, "Angelet had originality in his ideas, and wrote with elegance and purity".

References

1797 births
1832 deaths
Belgian classical pianists
19th-century classical pianists
Belgian male classical composers
19th-century classical composers
Musicians from Ghent
Conservatoire de Paris alumni
Male classical pianists
19th-century Belgian male musicians